Gulshat Fazlitdinova (born 28 August 1992) is a Russian long-distance runner. She competed in the 5000 metres event at the 2015 World Championships in Athletics in Beijing, China.

References

External links

1992 births
Living people
Place of birth missing (living people)
Russian female long-distance runners
Russian female cross country runners
World Athletics Championships athletes for Russia
Russian Athletics Championships winners
Universiade medalists in athletics (track and field)
Universiade gold medalists for Russia